Clinidium guildingii is a species of ground beetle in the subfamily Rhysodinae. It was described by William Forsell Kirby in 1830. Clinidium guildingii is endemic to Saint Vincent (Lesser Antilles). It measures  in length.

References

Clinidium
Beetles of North America
Endemic fauna of Saint Vincent and the Grenadines
Beetles described in 1830
Taxa named by William Forsell Kirby